Alejandro "Álex" Millán Iranzo (born 7 November 1999) is a Spanish professional footballer who plays as a forward for Villarreal CF B.

Club career
Born in Zaragoza, Aragon, Millán joined Real Zaragoza's youth setup in 2009, aged nine. In July 2016, he moved to Villarreal CF for a fee of €350,000, signing a contract until 2020.

On 27 August 2017, while still a youth, Millán made his senior debut with the C-team, coming on as a late substitute for Andrei Rațiu in a 0–0 Tercera División away draw against Crevillente Deportivo. He was definitely promoted to the C-side ahead of the 2018–19 campaign, and scored his first senior goals on 12 October 2018, netting a hat-trick in a 4–2 home win against CD Acero.

Millán was promoted to the reserves in 2019, in Segunda División B. He made his first team debut on 16 December of the following year; after replacing Dani Raba in the 78th minute, he scored his team's fifth in a 6–0 away routing of SD Leioa, for the season's Copa del Rey.

Millán made his La Liga debut on 19 December 2020, replacing fellow youth graduate Gerard Moreno in a 3–1 away success over CA Osasuna. The following 13 August, he moved abroad and joined Belgian First Division A club Cercle Brugge KSV on loan for one year. Following the signing of fellow striker Silvère Ganvoula in January 2022, his loan was taken over by league leaders Royale Union Saint-Gilloise on 28 January.

On 8 July 2022, Millán was loaned to Famalicão in Portugal for the 2022–23 season. The following 7 January, his loan was terminated, and he returned to the B-team in Segunda División.

Career statistics

Club

References

External links

1999 births
Living people
Footballers from Zaragoza
Spanish footballers
Association football forwards
La Liga players
Segunda División B players
Tercera División players
Belgian Pro League players
Primeira Liga players
Villarreal CF C players
Villarreal CF B players
Villarreal CF players
Cercle Brugge K.S.V. players
Royale Union Saint-Gilloise players
F.C. Famalicão players
Spain youth international footballers
Spanish expatriate footballers
Spanish expatriate sportspeople in Belgium
Expatriate footballers in Belgium
Spanish expatriate sportspeople in Portugal
Expatriate footballers in Portugal